Fatima Tabaamrant (berber: ⴼⴰⵜⵉⵎⴰ ⵜⴰⴱⴰⵄⵎⵕⴰⵏⵜ; born 1962) is a Moroccan Berber actress and singer-songwriter. She sings and performs in her native Berber tongue.

Fatima Tabaamrant, was born in 1962 in Boughafar, into the Idaw Nacer tribe, which is part of the confederation of the  tribes of the Sous region. She spent her childhood years in Ifrane and Lakhass, Province of Tiznit, in the greater external-peripheral, fringe and the outskirts (also parts Jbel Atlas Saghru, Greater lesser Atlas) all are parts high-Atlas and Sous Region, Morocco.

Filmography

Autobiographical Film
Tihya 1994 "She has played the role of the singer in an autobiographical film called Tihya".

Biography
 Fi Dakira, Fatima Tabaamrant biography. Channel 1M TV (RTM) Morocco.
 Imariren, Fatima Tabaamrant biography. 2M MONDE TV Morocco, on Friday June 4, 2010 at 9:35, (video length 26 minutes and 19 seconds)
Imariren, an Amazigh term meaning "singers", is a cultural magazine that profiles the great names in Amazigh music of all genres, tracing the milestones in the evolution of their career since their debut.

Television Performance
 Massar TV Show (Music) Fatima Tabaamrant, ("Igh Ka Tzriti") musical performance, 2M MONDE TV Morocco. Part of Ahmed Amentag (biography), a 1-hour 45 minutes show (Tabaamrant performs after 10 minutes), April 16, 2010.

Concert tour 
'2010'

Asnières-sur-Oise, France

L'appel de l'Atlas (Echo of the Atlas), Chant berbère de l'Atlas (Songs and Dance of the Atlas), Du slam à l'Atlas (The Sounds in the Atlas), Fatima Tabaamrant, Live Performance, Royaumont Abbey (Department 95), Asnières-sur-Oise, France (October 3, 8, 9, 10, 2010),

'2009'

Paris, France

Izlan Morocco Cycle, Fatima Tabaamrant, live performance (2009). Berber songs, poetry and dance. The Atlas Mountains and the Moroccan desert.Morocco cycle, at Théâtre Claude Lévi-Strauss (Musée du Quai Branly) Paris, France
from Friday 27 November to Saturday 5 December 2009

Timitar Festival, Agadir, Morocco (Friday, July 6, 2007)

'2006'

 7th International Festival of Volubilis. "Amazigh Evening" at Volubilis, Morocco. (August 4, 2006)
 4th edition Raïss Lhaj Belaïd (Theme) at Place El Mechouar, Tiznit, Tiznit-Provence, Morocco. (July 8, 2006)
'1999'

Paris, France

Fatima Tabaamrant,  Thursday, May 13 and Saturday, May 15, 1999 at a concert in Paris

'1994'

Milan, Italy
Fatima Tabaamrant, performed in Milan Italy, outdoor summer concerts ("Berber Nights").

Discography

Albums
 The Echo of the Atlas (Taghlaghalt), Release Date December 11, 2007

The CD (Taghlaghalt Or The Echo of the Atlas Rayssa Fatima Tabaamrant) available online retail store, Amazon.com, Barnes & Noble,

See also 

 Tashelhit
 Naima Moujahid
 Ahmed Amentag

Further reading

External links
 Azawan.com Fatima Tabaamrant, biography and more (English, French, and Berber).

References 

1962 births
20th-century Moroccan women singers
21st-century Moroccan women singers
Berber Moroccans
Berber musicians
Living people
Shilha people